The Church at Home and Abroad was a Presbyterian periodical published from 1887 to 1898. Henry A. Nelson was its editor-in-chief for many years. It was headquartered in Philadelphia, Pennsylvania.

References

Sources
 
 
 

Magazines established in 1887
Magazines disestablished in 1898
Religious magazines published in the United States
Magazines published in Philadelphia